"Guitars, Cadillacs" is a song written and recorded by American country music artist Dwight Yoakam.  It was released in June 1986 as the second single and partial title track from his debut album Guitars, Cadillacs, Etc., Etc..  It peaked at number 4 in the United States, and number 2 in Canada.

Music video
The music video was directed and produced by Sherman Halsey, and features Dwight Yoakam at a concert.

Critical reception
Larry Flick, of Billboard magazine reviewed the song favorably, saying that "walking bass, twangy guitar, fiddle, and Yoakam's voice make it a pure hillbilly delight."

In June 2014, Rolling Stone magazine ranked "Guitars, Cadillacs" #94 in their list of the 100 greatest country songs.

In popular culture
The song plays during the bar scene in the 1991 science fiction action film Terminator 2: Judgment Day when the Terminator walks into a biker bar looking for clothes to wear; this scene has been omitted from some television airings. It was also featured in the film Dutch released the same year. The song made another appearance in the 2019 film Terminator: Dark Fate, as an homage to its presence in Terminator 2.

American rock group The Protomen covered the song for "William Shakespeare Presents: Terminator the Second", a parody of  Terminator 2 consisting entirely of lines from Shakespearean works. The song is featured on the soundtrack of the play.

Chart performance
"Guitars, Cadillacs" debuted at number 54 on the U.S. Billboard Hot Country Singles & Tracks for the week of July 12, 1986.

References

1986 singles
1986 songs
Dwight Yoakam songs
Songs written by Dwight Yoakam
Reprise Records singles
Music videos directed by Sherman Halsey
Song recordings produced by Pete Anderson